The Regius Professorship of Mathematics is the name given to three chairs in mathematics at British universities, one at the University of St Andrews, founded by Charles II in 1668, the second one at the University of Warwick, founded in 2013 to commemorate the Diamond Jubilee of Elizabeth II and the third one at the University of Oxford, founded in 2016.

University of St Andrews (1668)

From 1997 to 2015 there was no Regius Professor of Mathematics.  In April 2013 the post was advertised, and in 2015 Igor Rivin was appointed. He was succeeded by Kenneth Falconer in 2017.

List of Regius Professors of Mathematics

The following list may be incomplete.

 1668–1674 James Gregory
 1674–1688 William Sanders
 1689–1690 James Fenton
 1690–1707 vacant
 1707–1739 Charles Gregory
 1739–1765 David Gregory
 1765–1807 Nicolas Vilant
 1807–1809 vacant
 1809–1820 Robert Haldane
 1820–1858 Thomas Duncan
 1857–1858 John Couch Adams
 1859–1877 William L F Fischer
 1877–1879 George Chrystal
 1879–1921 Peter Redford Scott Lang
 1921–1950 Herbert Westren Turnbull
 1950–1969 Edward Thomas Copson
 1970–1997 John Mackintosh Howie
 1997–2015 vacant
 2015–2017 Igor Rivin
2017–present Kenneth Falconer

University of Warwick (2013)

The creation of the post of the Regius Professor of Mathematics was announced in January 2013, in March 2014 Martin Hairer was appointed to the position.

University of Oxford (2016)

The creation of the post of the Regius Professor of Mathematics was announced in June 2016 and Andrew Wiles was appointed as the first holder of the chair in May 2018.

In August 2020, it was announced that the Regius Professorship in Mathematics at the University of Oxford will become a permanent fixture at Merton College.

References

Mathematics education in the United Kingdom
Mathematics Regius Professor
Professorships at the University of Oxford
Professorships in mathematics